The Wreck of the Singapore, also known as  The Singapore Mutiny, is a 1928 American silent drama film directed by Ralph Ince and starring Ince, Estelle Taylor, and Jim Mason.

Cast
 Ralph Ince as Kelsey  
 Estelle Taylor as Daisy  
 Jim Mason as Borg  
 Gardner James as The Stiff  
 William Irving as Huber  
 Harry Allen as Mr. Watts  
 Carl Axzelle as Cockney  
 Martha Mattox as Mrs. Watts 
 Robert Gaillard as Captain  
 Frank Newburg as Petty Officer

References

Bibliography
 Quinlan, David. The Illustrated Guide to Film Directors. Batsford, 1983.

External links

1928 films
Films directed by Ralph Ince
American silent feature films
1920s English-language films
American black-and-white films
Seafaring films
Silent American drama films
1928 drama films
Film Booking Offices of America films
1920s American films
Silent adventure films